Dahu was a form of robe/jacket which originated in the Ming dynasty. In Ming dynasty, the dahu was either a new type of banbi or a sleeveless jacket, whose designs was influenced by the Mongol Yuan dynasty clothing.

History

Yuan dynasty 

In the Yuan dynasty, banbi were also referred as dahu in a broad sense but could also refer to a specific type of banbi of the same name, which is a half-sleeved long robe (changpao 长袍) with a cross-collar closing to the right (jiaoling youren 交领右衽). This form of dahu (y-shaped collar long robe with short sleeves) was worn by the Mongols in the Yuan dynasty over long-sleeved robes in similar fashion as it was worn prior to the founding of the Yuan dynasty.

Ming dynasty 
In the Ming dynasty, the dahu could be worn over the tieli robe and/or could be worn under the round-collar robe. Some forms of dahu was bestowed to the Joseon Kings; for example, in 1444 under the rule of King Sejong of Joseon, the Ming dynasty bestowed him dahu, along with cheollik and gollyeongpo. In the 21st century, the dahu, along with many forms of hanfu, was revived following the Hanfu movement.

Construction and design 
The dahu combined the features of the Tang and Song dynasties hanfu and the Mongol Yuan dynasty clothing. The dahu was a cross-collar jacket which wrapped on the right side; it could be either short-sleeves or no-sleeves.

Gallery

Similar-looking garments 
 Dapho – a Korean short sleeved overcoat.
 Banbi

See also 

 Fashion in Yuan dynasty
 Hanfu
 Terlig

Notes

References 

Chinese traditional clothing